Hollenbach is a municipality in the district of Aichach-Friedberg in Bavaria in Germany.

Hollenbach or Höllenbach may also refer to:

Alwyn Hollenbach (born 1985), former South African rugby union footballer
David Hollenbach (born 1942), Jesuit priest, professor, author, and moral theologian
Sam Hollenbach (born 1983), American football quarterback
Shawn Hollenbach (born 1981), American comedian, writer and actor
Todd Hollenbach (born 1960), American politician
Höllenbach (Kahl), a river of Bavaria, Germany, tributary of the Kahl